Milford Junction may refer to:

Milford Junction, a rail junction between the lines of the York and North Midland Railway and Leeds and Selby Railway
Milford Old junction railway station, also known as York Junction, and Gascoigne Wood; on the Leeds to Selby line, UK
Milford Junction railway station on the York and North Midland Railway, UK
Milford Junction, Indiana